, there were about 96,000 electric vehicles in Florida (not including plug-in hybrid vehicles). , 3.5% of all new vehicles sold in the state were electric.

Government policy
, the state government offers tax rebates of up to $300 for electric vehicle purchases.

Until 2017, electric vehicles were exempt from all road tolls in the state.

In March 2021, lawmakers in the Florida State Legislature introduced a series of bills that would impose a $135 annual fee on electric vehicles, to offset the lack of revenue from gasoline taxes.

Charging stations
, there were about 2,400 electric vehicle charging station locations and 6,000 charging ports in Florida. , there were 844 DC charging stations in Florida.

The Infrastructure Investment and Jobs Act, signed into law in November 2021, allocates  for charging stations in Florida.

By region

Gainesville
The first electric vehicles were added to the Gainesville municipal fleet in 2018.

Jacksonville
, there were 197 public charging station ports in the Jacksonville metropolitan area.

Miami
In October 2021, a policy came into effect in Miami-Dade County requiring 10% of all new vehicles purchased for the county fleet to be electric. This number will increase by 10 percentage points per year until it reaches 100%.

Orlando
In December 2020, the Central Florida Expressway Authority announced that it was considering taking part in a pilot program to charge electric vehicles while driving.

Tallahassee
In May 2022, the Leon County Commission adopted an ordinance requiring new residential and commercial buildings constructed to be equipped with charging infrastructure.

Tampa
In December 2020, the Tampa municipal government purchased the first set of plug-in electric vehicles for its fleet.

References

Road transportation in Florida
Florida